Gregory Dennis  (1926-2017) was an Australian rugby league footballer from the 1940s.

Greg Dennis played his junior league at Thirroul, New South Wales and was selected to represent Southern Districts against the touring British Lions team in 1946 aged only 19.
He joined St. George Dragons in 1947 for one season, but struggled to retain a first grade spot during the season. He retired from Sydney football at the conclusion of 1947 and returned to Thirroul.

References

Australian rugby league players
St. George Dragons players
1926 births
2017 deaths
Rugby league players from Wollongong
Rugby league wingers